Humåtak (formerly Umatac) is a village on the southwestern coast of the United States territory of Guam.  The month of March in the Chamorro language is "Umatalaf," or "to catch guatafi," which is believed to be the root word of Umatac. The village's population has decreased since the island's 2010 census, and it is by far the least populated village on the island.

History 

Prior to Spanish arrival on the island, an annual celebration was held north of the village at Fouha Rock where the first humans were created according to the legends of the Chamorro people, the native people of Guam.

In 1521, the Portuguese Explorer Ferdinand Magellan arrived on Guam while circumnavigating the globe. Umatac Bay is traditionally cited as the location of the Spanish landing. Another explorer, Miguel López de Legazpi, arrived in Umatac in 1565 and claimed the island of Guam for Spain.

When Guam was colonized in the 17th century, the Spanish made Umatac a parish so the Chamorro people in the area could be converted to Christianity. Remains of two Spanish forts built on hills on either side of the village - Fort Nuestra Señora de la Soledad and Fort San Jose - are still visible today.

In 1898, Guam was taken by the United States during the Spanish–American War. Under the U.S. administration, the small village has grown gradually. The Discovery Day festival is held every year in the village. While the holiday was first established in memory of Magellan's discovery of the island, it is now a celebration of Chamorro culture.

In August 2021, Gov. Lou Leon Guerrero signed a bill officially changing the name of the village.

Demographics
The U.S. Census Bureau designates one census-designated place, Umatac.

Education
The Guam Department of Education serves the island. The F. Q. Sanchez Elementary School in Umatac has closed at the end of summer 2011 due to budget cuts. Students have shifted to a nearby Merizo Elementary School. The unused facility was then cleared for use by the Umatac Mayor's Office.

Southern High School in Santa Rita serves the village.

Mayor of Umatac

Commissioner
Jesus T. Quinata (1961–1969)
Jesus S. Quinata (1952–1961)
Albert T. Topasna (1969–1973)

Mayor
 Albert T. Topasna (1st Term) (1973–1985)
 Cecilia Q. Morrison (1985–1989)
 Albert T. Topasna (2nd Term) (1989–1991)
 Dean D. Sanchez (1st Term) (1991–1993)
 Jose T. Quinata (1993–1997)
 Jesus A. Aquiningoc (1997–2001)
 Tony A. Quinata (2001–2005)
 Daniel Q. Sanchez (2005–2009)
 Dean D. Sanchez (2nd Term) (2009–2013)
 Johnny A. Quinata (2013–present)

See also 
 Villages of Guam

References 

 Rogers, Robert F (1995). Destiny's Landfall: A History of Guam: University of Hawai'i Press. 
 Sanchez, Pedro C. Guahan, Guam: The History of our Island: Sanchez Publishing House.

External links 

 "Umatac (Humåtak)" - article on Guampedia.com
 "Umatac - Guam's Cradle of Creation" by Anthony P. Sanchez, Pacific Daily News, 26 April 2007
 Village Map, Pacific Daily News
 

 
Census-designated places in Guam